The Cutting Room Floor may refer to:

 The cutting room floor, itself
 The Cutting Room Floor (album), by Over the Rhine
 The Cutting Room Floor (mixtape), by The Alchemist
 The Cutting Room Floor (website), a wiki devoted to documenting unused, removed, or region-altered content in video games
 Cutting Room Floor (album), a 2005 compilation album by British progressive rock band Kino

See also
The Cutting Room (disambiguation)